The following is a list of the television networks and announcers who have broadcast college football's Armed Forces Bowl throughout the years.

Television

Radio

References

Armed Forces Bowl
Broadcasters
Armed Forces Bowl
Armed Forces Bowl broadcasters